SeaWorld Parks & Entertainment is an American theme park and entertainment company headquartered in Orlando, Florida. The company is a subsidiary of SeaWorld Entertainment Inc. and owns and operates thirteen recreational destinations in the United States, including eight theme parks and five water parks. Notable brands within its portfolio include SeaWorld and Busch Gardens. In May 2018, Themed Entertainment Association and the global management firm AECOM reported that SeaWorld Parks & Entertainment ranked ninth in the world for attendance among theme park companies, led by parks SeaWorld Orlando and Busch Gardens Tampa Bay.

History

Busch Gardens
Anheuser-Busch started its Busch Gardens parks with its Tampa, Florida location in 1959, which is considered the beginning of its Busch Entertainment unit. Tampa was expanded in 1962. A second modern Garden theme park and tropical reserve, was built in 1966 next to the Van Nuys brewery. A third location, Busch Gardens Williamsburg, opened on May 16, 1975, next to their brewery in James City County, Virginia. 
On Memorial Day weekend 1971, a Houston location was opened, but soon closed in early 1973.

Busch Entertainment
The Busch Garden division was incorporated in 1979 as Busch Entertainment Corporation to support its growth. That growth came the next year, with its Williamsburg location added Italy to its culture roster plus add two whole parks. Next to the Tampa Busch Gardens, the Adventure Island Water Park opened in June.

Meanwhile, in July 1980, the Sesame Place in Langhorne, Pennsylvania, jointly planned with the Children's Television Workshop and based on Sesame Street, opened. A second Sesame Place was opened in Irving, Texas in June 1982 only to close a few years later on October 28, 1984; Busch Entertainment announced in January 1985 that the park would not open as scheduled in May as revenue and attendance were not as expected.

In September 1989, Busch Entertainment purchased Harcourt Brace Jovanovich Park Group which included Boardwalk and Baseball, Cypress Gardens and the SeaWorld theme park chain. The Boardwalk and Baseball theme park was closed on January 17, 1990, a few hours early. The Baseball City Stadium would continue its operations, while the park and stadium were up for sale. Busch acquired a tenth park, Water Country USA in 1992, which was near its existing Williamsburg location. In 1993, the company hit its record high attendance for all its parks with over 19 million people with a record setting year for Tampa Busch Gardens. In 1995, Cypress Gardens was sold to the park's management.

Busch Entertainment announced in November 1992 its joint venture with Grand Tibidabo to build Tibi Gardens in Salou, Catalonia, Spain with other adjunct developments. By the park's May 1, 1995 opening, Grand Tibidabo was replaced by Tussauds Group, Fecsa and La Caixa as partners and renamed Port Aventura. Universal Parks & Resorts purchase some share in 1998.

The company's marketing program of a regional Florida Fun Cards season pass was launched in 2000. These pass were good for seven-months at the cost of a single admission. Being successful, the program was extended to all its parks. This was followed up in 2001 with a tiered reward card called Passport with four level name after medals metals. This program gain additional contact information for its marketing database. The additional marketing the database allowed plus the two program, local pass and reward card, allowed them to stay afloat during the economic downturn that started in 2001.

In 1999, close to 200 acres of rural land was purchased by Busch Gardens Tampa so that animals could be relocated during construction of a new hotel, which ended up never being built. In early 2001, the company sold the Aurora SeaWorld to Six Flags, while the first reservations-only park, Discovery Cove, opened next to Orlando SeaWorld. Beginning November 9, 2007, the parks collectively became known as Worlds of Discovery. Prior to the introduction of the Worlds of Discovery brand, the parks were marketed as Anheuser-Busch Adventure Parks. A new price plan came along with the new name, where purchasing tickets to multiple parks would get a discount. Sesame Street Bay of Play opened in 2008 at SeaWorld San Diego.

Busch Entertainment promoted a number of SeaWorld Orlando executives to corporate ending with the promotion of Orlando executive vice president and general manager Jim Atchison to Busch president and chief operating officer and chairman and president Keith M. Kasen to Busch chairman and chief executive officer on December 1, 2007. With so many executives promoted and staying in Orlando, Anheuser-Busch Cos moved the entertainment unit's headquarters to Orlando in 2008. By this time, SeaWorld Orlando was seen as the company's flagship theme park. 

In Dubai, the company in February 2008 signed a licensing and management deal for Busch's Worlds of Discovery, a four theme park development, with Nakheel Properties, an arm of the Dubai government. Worlds of Discovery was planned to open in 2012. The first phase that was planned to open in December 2012 was to consist of SeaWorld and Aquatica Dubai. The second phase, consisting of Busch Gardens and Discovery Cove were slated for 2015. However, the global financial crisis had prompted both Nakheel and Busch Entertainment to suspend development indefinitely in February 2009, although both sides expected at the time to move forward when the financial climate improves.

In 2008, Anheuser-Busch was acquired by Brazilian-Belgian brewer InBev. Based on its previous acquisitions, it was widely expected that InBev would later sell off non-core assets in order to pay down the debt created by its purchase of Anheuser-Busch; the theme-park division was considered one of the most likely assets to be sold. In early 2009, InBev began soliciting bids for those assets in advance of an anticipated sale. As part of the plans to shed the division, Busch Entertainment ended the free beer-sampling programs at Busch Gardens Williamsburg and at nine other theme parks which have Anheuser-Busch BrewMaster's Clubs. Similarly, Busch Entertainment broke from its parent company and terminated a benefit where employees of legal age received two free cases of Anheuser-Busch beer per month, a benefit that continued for the rest of the company. At the time, InBev was thought to be considering selling the parks to the highest bidder, or spinning off Busch Entertainment as an independent company. It was suggested at one point that NBCUniversal was interested in purchasing Busch Entertainment, and folding it into the Universal Studios Theme Parks chain, but no official bid for the company surfaced. However, other asset sales, such as the sale of Tsingtao Brewery and an issuance of $3 billion in new long-term debt in May 2009, raised over $11 billion since the start of 2009, temporarily reducing the need to sell Busch Entertainment. Other cited reasons for an apparent reluctance to sell off the company included still-volatile credit markets and receipt of initial bids that were lower than expected.

SeaWorld Parks & Entertainment
In late 2009, the Blackstone Group reportedly entered into negotiations to acquire Busch Entertainment. The Blackstone Group already owned a partnership in Universal Orlando Resort, and a significant interest in Merlin Entertainments, which operates attractions and theme parks such as Madame Tussauds and Legoland. Previous estimates have valued Busch Entertainment at US$2.5 billion – 3.0 billion.

On October 7, 2009, the discussions came to fruition as Anheuser-Busch InBev announced plans to sell Busch Entertainment Corporation to the Blackstone Group in a deal worth approximately US$2.7 billion. As part of the deal, Blackstone maintained the current management team from Busch Entertainment and operate it as a separate entity. Further, Anheuser-Busch would sign a sponsorship agreement with the company, thus allowing the two Busch Gardens parks to keep their current names and promotions, including the "Here's to the Heroes" military appreciation program. In announcing the deal, Busch Entertainment President Jim Atchison said that Blackstone's acquisition brings "an awful lot of strategic vision for us. We're going to continue to grow the business together." The company was also renamed SeaWorld Parks & Entertainment.

The acquisition would be done with no loss of jobs at the parks or at the company's Orlando headquarters. New departments were hired to fill positions that would have previously been managed by Anheuser-Busch, such as a legal department and procurement staff. The largest proposed change to the operation of the parks would be the removal of Anheuser-Busch's Clydesdales from those parks that had them and the removal of the A&Eagle logos. Anheuser-Busch licenses the "Busch Gardens" name to SeaWorld Entertainment perpetually.

Blackstone Group began pushing SeaWorld Parks and Entertainment into other areas including plans for TV and animation divisions, expanding its consumer products unit and develop usage for its park film footage. In mid-2011, the company started the SeaWorld Pictures division with Scott Helmstedter as chief creative officer. The division's first release was Turtle: The Incredible Journey in June 2011. Helmstadter indicated in September 2011 that the TV and animation divisions had several items on their slate and the three entertainment units would be at MIPCOM and Kidscreen Summit 2012 looking for projects. SeaWorld Entertainment agreed in January 2012 to a multi-year licensing deal with Ruckus Media, a Connecticut-based app developer, for SeaWorld's animal-based digital story books for ages three to eight. Sleepy Giant Entertainment and SeaWorld Parks released Turtle Trek, its first free mobile app based on the ride of the same name. SeaWorld and Nelvana Enterprises agreed in December 2012 to include Franklin and Friends with the SeaWorld Kids brand. Two special and co-branded books were planned.

SeaWorld Entertainment
On December 27, 2012, SeaWorld Parks & Entertainment announced that it had filed for an initial public offering (IPO) of stock, while changing its name to SeaWorld Entertainment at the IPO. Part of the proceeds from this sale would go to Blackstone Group, which would retain a controlling interest in the company. It began trading April 19, 2013 on the New York Stock Exchange with a ticker symbol of SEAS.

In September 2013, SeaWorld Kids media unit and Little Airplane Productions agreed to develop a new conservation and animal themed TV show for preschoolers. The property was announced in March 2014 as Billy Green Builds!

Following CNN's broadcast of the documentary Blackfish, which criticized the company's handling of killer whale exhibits, SeaWorld's profits went into a steep decline and its share values plummeted. SeaWorld said in August 2014 that the film had hurt revenues at its San Diego, California park. On December 11, 2014, SeaWorld announced that chief executive Jim Atchison would resign, with an interim successor replacing him on January 15, 2015. The company's share price had fallen 44% in 2014.

The company and Village Roadshow in 2014 signed a development agreement for additional Asian theme parks. By November 2015, SeaWorld and Evans Hotels formed a partnership to explore the development for a Mission Bay SeaWorld-branded resort hotel connected to the San Diego park. By December 2016, the Village Roadshow agreement expired. SeaWorld revived its Dubai plans in December 2016 with Miral but with only a SeaWorld Park joining four other parks on Yas Island when it opens in 2022.

In August 2015, SeaWorld announced an 84% drop in second quarter 2015 net income compared to the year before. Total income was down 3% from 2014 to 2015. Visitors fell by 100,000, from 6.58 million to 6.48 million.

The board of directors appointed Joel Manby as president and chief executive officer starting April 7, 2015. While the fully integrated resorts model, resorts, hotels and retail, has been on the drawing boards for the company at various times, Manby considered it a key to his plans for the company. As it seems that their parks are not considered designation parks but complementary parks per In Parks Magazine. Two new directors were appointed to the company board that held positions at fully integrated theme park resorts. SeaWorld Parks formed its Resort Development Group on February 1, 2016, with the appointment of the Vice President of Resort Development Steve Iandolo. Anthony Esparza also became the new SeaWorld Chief Creative Officer (CCO). Deep Blue Creative, announced as a new unit in early November 2016, is mostly the former SeaWorld media unit, less licensing and consumer products, led by the previous CCO. The first projects under the Deep Blue unit are Kraken Virtual Reality (VR) ride at SeaWorld Orlando, Wave Breaker: The Rescue Coaster at SeaWorld San Antonio and Electric Ocean end-of-day event debuting summer of 2017 at SeaWorlds Orlando and San Diego.

On March 24, 2017, Blackstone Group announced that it would sell its 21% stake to Zhonghong Group. Zhonghong Group was restricted in purchasing additional shares and sale of their shares for two years. They added two additional directors to the board for Zhonghong. SeaWorld agreed to provide advice and support services to Zhonghong Holding, a Zhonghong Group affiliate, in China, Taiwan, Hong Kong and Macau for theme parks, water parks and family entertainment centers development.

Sesame Workshop and SeaWorld Parks & Entertainment in May 2017 extended their licensing agreement for Sesame Place with plans to build a second US location to open in mid-2021. The extended agreement lasts through 2031 with the option for additional locations. At SeaWorld Orlando in early 2019, Sesame Street Land opened. On October 21, 2019, it was announced that the second Sesame Place would be located in San Diego at Chula Vista, California replacing the current Aquatica San Diego, which closed at the end of the season in Fall 2020. Originally set to open in 2021, its opening was delayed to March 26, 2022 due to the COVID-19 pandemic.

Manby stepped down in late February 2018 as CEO with John Reilly being appointed as interim CEO. Esparza left as chief creative officer on March 1, 2018. The company appointed Carnival Cruise chief operating officer Gus Antorcha as Seaworld CEO in February 2019 with Reilly stepping down to be COO and eventually leaving the company one month later.

The company settled an annual pass class action lawsuit for $11.5 million settlement, where the company automatically renewed annual passes after the end of the originally ordered pass expiration. In August 2018, the company extended its licensing agreement with for Rudolph and Friends with Character Arts to appear at their parks' holiday events until January 2024.

In May 2019, Zhonghong Group defaulted on its loans which were secured by Seaworld common stock. The company turned its shares over to its lenders. Thus Seaworld terminated its agreements for park development with the group. Yongli Wang, one of the group's representative on the board of director resigned while the other board chairman Yoshi Maruyama was asked to stay on the board. Seaworld Entertainment bought back 5.6 million shares from an affiliate of Pacific Alliance Group in late May 2019. While Pacific Alliance Group separately sold 13.2 million shares to Hill Path Capital. Hill Path share of the company after the purchases was a controlling stake of 34.5%. Seaworld agreed to have three Hill Path director nominees join its board.

After seven months in the post, CEO Gus Antorcha resigned on September 16, 2019. That same day, its Orlando call center was laid off and replaced by an outsourcing company. The board hired Sergio D. Rivera, previously president and CEO of ILG Inc.’s vacation ownership business, as a replacement in November 2019 and would join the board of directors along with Neha Jogani Narang. On April 6, 2020, Rivera resigned as CEO with chief financial officer Marc Swanson appointed as interim CEO.

Current properties 
Theme parks
Busch Gardens parks
Sesame Place parks

 Marine parks
SeaWorld parks
Discovery Cove

Water parks
Aquatica chain
Adventure Island
Water Country USA

Future properties 
 SeaWorld Abu Dhabi

On December 13, 2016, SeaWorld Parks & Entertainment announced a new partnership with Miral to bring SeaWorld Abu Dhabi to Yas Island. The park, which would be situated to the northeast of Ferrari World, was set to open in 2022 and would of been the first SeaWorld without orcas. SeaWorld is licensing the brand to Miral, who would fully fund the project. SeaWorld revived its Dubai plans in December 2016 with Miral but with only a SeaWorld Park joining four other parks on Yas Island when it opens in 2023.

Former properties 
Busch Gardens parks
 Pasadena, California (1905–1937)
 Los Angeles, California (1964–1979)
 Houston, Texas (1971–1972)

SeaWorld parks
 SeaWorld Ohio (Aurora, Ohio) (1970–2000)

Other parks
 Cypress Gardens (Winter Haven, Florida) was purchased alongside the SeaWorld parks in 1989, then sold to the park's management team. The park closed in 2009. Acquired by Merlin Entertainments in 2010, the park now operates as Legoland Florida, which opened in October 2011.
 Boardwalk and Baseball (Haines City, Florida) was purchased alongside the SeaWorld parks in 1989, but was promptly closed.
 Port Aventura (Salou, Spain) was constructed in 1995 in a joint venture between The Tussauds Group (40,01 %), La Caixa (33,19 %), Anheuser-Busch (19,9 %) and FECSA (6,7 %). In 1998 the majority of Tussauds Group'shares in the park were sold to Universal Parks & Resorts. Universal bought out its partners in 2004.
 Sesame Place (June 1982—October 1984) Irving, Texas

Other units
Resort Development Group, hotel and retail development unit
Deep Blue Creative, creative division
Theme Park Development, U.S.A., unit consisting of two teams to develop attractions, food experiences and retailing 
Project Management
Guest Experiences 
Theme Park Development, Global - feasibility, development and site evaluation of new parks and new business models
Resort Development - land planning, resort and hotel development, new hospitality experiences
Events and Entertainment - in resort live entertainment support team for theater, restaurant and retail to encourage repeat visits
Media Enterprises - film, television, and music business
Expedition X -prototyping and new technology

Media projects

See also
Incidents at SeaWorld parks
Blackfish (film)
Sea World (Australia) - Australian Theme Park with similar name, style & theming.

References 

 
Amusement park companies
Amusement companies of the United States
Entertainment companies of the United States
Companies based in Orlando, Florida
American companies established in 1959
Entertainment companies established in 1959
1959 establishments in Florida
Companies listed on the New York Stock Exchange
The Blackstone Group companies
2009 mergers and acquisitions
2012 initial public offerings